Imaginary time is a mathematical representation of time which appears in some approaches to special relativity and quantum mechanics. It finds uses in connecting quantum mechanics with statistical mechanics and in certain cosmological theories.

Mathematically, imaginary time is real time which has undergone a Wick rotation so that its coordinates are multiplied by the imaginary unit i. Imaginary time is not imaginary in the sense that it is unreal or made-up (any more than, say, irrational numbers defy logic), it is simply expressed in terms of what mathematicians call imaginary numbers.

Origins

Stephen Hawking popularized the concept of imaginary time in his book The Universe in a Nutshell.

In fact, the terms "real" and "imaginary" for numbers are just a historical accident, much like the terms "rational" and "irrational":

In cosmology

Derivation
In the Minkowski spacetime model adopted by the theory of relativity, spacetime is represented as a four-dimensional surface or manifold. Its four-dimensional equivalent of a distance in three-dimensional space is called an interval. Assuming that a specific time period is represented as a real number in the same way as a distance in space, an interval  in relativistic spacetime is given by the usual formula but with time negated:

Mathematically this is equivalent to writing 

The equation may then be rewritten in normalised form: 

Application to cosmology
Hawking noted the utility of rotating time intervals into an imaginary metric in certain situations, in 1971.

In physical cosmology, imaginary time may be incorporated into certain models of the universe which are solutions to the equations of general relativity. In particular, imaginary time can help to smooth out gravitational singularities, where known physical laws break down, to remove the singularity and avoid such breakdowns (see Hartle–Hawking state). The Big Bang, for example, appears as a singularity in ordinary time but, when modelled with imaginary time, the singularity can be removed and the Big Bang functions like any other point in four-dimensional spacetime. Any boundary to spacetime is a form of singularity, where the smooth nature of spacetime breaks down. With all such singularities removed from the Universe, it thus can have no boundary and Stephen Hawking speculated that "the boundary condition to the Universe is that it has no boundary".

However, the unproven nature of the relationship between actual physical time and imaginary time incorporated into such models has raised criticisms. Roger Penrose has noted that there needs to be a transition from the Riemannian metric (often referred to as "Euclidean" in this context) with imaginary time at the Big Bang to a Lorentzian metric with real time for the evolving Universe. Also, modern observations suggest that the Universe is open and will never shrink back to a Big Crunch. If this proves true, then the end-of-time boundary still remains.

In quantum statistical mechanics 

The equations of the quantum field can be obtained by taking the Fourier transform of the equations of statistical mechanics. Since the Fourier transform of a function typically shows up as its inverse, the point particles of statistical mechanics become, under a Fourier transform, the infinitely extended harmonic oscillators of quantum field theory. The Green's function of an inhomogeneous linear differential operator, defined on a domain with specified initial conditions or boundary conditions, is its impulse response, and mathematically we define the point particles of statistical mechanics as Dirac delta functions, which is to say impulses. Therefore, their Fourier transforms contain only a discrete set of frequencies called Matsubara frequencies. 

The connection between statistical mechanics and quantum field theory is also seen in the transition amplitude  between an initial state  and a final state , where  is the Hamiltonian of that system. This avoids the need to do twice the work by evaluating both the statistical properties and the transition amplitudes.

Finally, by using a Wick rotation one can show that the Euclidean quantum field theory in (D + 1)-dimensional spacetime is nothing but quantum statistical mechanics in D-dimensional space.

See also
Euclidean quantum gravity
Multiple time dimensions

References

Further reading 

 Gerald D. Mahan. Many-Particle Physics, Chapter 3
 A. Zee Quantum field theory in a nutshell, Chapter V.2

External links 
 The Beginning of Time — Lecture by Stephen Hawking which discusses imaginary time.
 Stephen Hawking's Universe: Strange Stuff Explained — PBS site on imaginary time.

Quantum mechanics
Philosophy of time